Sven Lehmann (born 14 December 1979) is a German politician of Alliance 90/The Greens who has been serving as a member of the Bundestag from the state of North Rhine-Westphalia since 2017. 

In addition to his parliamentary work, Lehmann has been serving as Parliamentary State Secretary in the Federal Ministry of Family Affairs, Senior Citizens, Women and Youth and as the Federal Government's Commissioner for the Acceptance of Sexual and Gender Diversity (nicknamed the "Queer Commissioner") in the coalition government of Chancellor Olaf Scholz since 2021.

Early life and career 
Lehmann grew up in Troisdorf in the Rhein-Sieg district in then-West Germany. In 1999 he graduated from the Gymnasium zum Altenforst in Troisdorf. In 1999 he began his studies of political science, Romance studies and education in Cologne and Aix-en-Provence, which he completed in 2006 as Magister Artium (M.A.).

From 2005 to 2007 Lehmann headed the constituency office of Kerstin Müller, member of the Bundestag in Cologne. From 2007 he worked for the Rhineland Regional Council, most recently in occupational health management.

Political career 
From 2010 to 2018, Lehmann served as co-chair of the Green Party in North Rhine-Westphalia, alongside Monika Düker (2010–2014) and Mona Neubaur (2014–2018).

Lehmann became a member of the Bundestag in the 2017 German federal election, representing the Cologne II district. From 2018 until 2021, he was a member of the Committee on Labour and Social Affairs. He also served as his parliamentary group’s spokesman for queer politics and for social policy. Within his parliamentary group, coordinated the Trade Union and Social Advisory Council.

Lehmann has been serving as Parliamentary State Secretary to the Federal Ministry of Family Affairs, Senior Citizens, Women and Youth since December 8, 2021. On January 5, 2022 the Federal Government appointed him as Commissioner for the Acceptance of Sexual and Gender Diversity.

In the negotiations to form a coalition government of the Christian Democratic Union (CDU) and the Green Party under Minister-President of North Rhine-Westphalia Hendrik Wüst following the 2022 state elections, Lehmann was part of his party’s delegation in the working group on equality, women, families, children and youth.

Other activities 
 Stiftung Lesen, Member of the Board of Trustees (since 2022)
 Magnus Hirschfeld Foundation, Member of the Board of Trustees

Political positions 
Within the Green Party, Lehmann is considered to be part of its left wing. 

Referring to Women's Declaration International, Lehmann said "they are not women's rights advocates, they are transphobes."

In a podcast interview on online dating Lehmann remarked how actively Grindr was being used during parliament sessions, and how it relates to his work.

References

External links 

  
 Bundestag biography 

1979 births
Living people
Members of the Bundestag for North Rhine-Westphalia
Members of the Bundestag 2021–2025
Members of the Bundestag 2017–2021
German LGBT politicians
Gay politicians
LGBT members of the Bundestag
Members of the Bundestag for Alliance 90/The Greens